Faia may refer to:

People
 Given name
 Faia Younan (born 1992), Syrian singer

 Surname
 Carl Faia (born 1962), American composer and musician
 Priscilla Faia (born 1985), Canadian actor and writer

Places
 Faia, a civil parish in the municipality of Cabeceiras de Basto, Portugal

Other uses 
 Fellow of the American Institute of Architects
 Fellow of the Association of International Accountants